The 2023 Salford City Council elections are scheduled to take place on 4 May 2023 alongside other local elections across the United Kingdom. One third of seats (20) on Salford City Council will be up for election.

Background

History 
The Local Government Act 1972 created a two-tier system of metropolitan counties and districts covering Greater Manchester, Merseyside, South Yorkshire, Tyne and Wear, the West Midlands, and West Yorkshire starting in 1974. Salford was a district of the Greater Manchester metropolitan county. The Local Government Act 1985 abolished the metropolitan counties, with metropolitan districts taking on most of their powers as metropolitan boroughs. The Greater Manchester Combined Authority was created in 2011 and began electing the mayor of Greater Manchester from 2017, which was given strategic powers covering a region coterminous with the former Greater Manchester metropolitan county.

Since its formation, Salford City Council has continuously been under Labour control. In the most recent council election in 2022, Labour won 15 seats, with the Conservatives and Liberal Democrats winning two seats each and an independent politician winning one.

As the Local Government Boundary Commission for England produced new boundaries for Manchester ahead of the 2021 election, meaning that the 2021 elections were all-out, with all councillors being elected before returning to electing by thirds, candidates up for re-election in 2023 are those who came second in each ward in 2021.

Electoral process 
The council elects its councillors in thirds, with a third being up for election every year for three years, with no election in the fourth year. The election will take place by first-past-the-post voting, with wards generally being represented by three councillors, with one elected in each election year to serve a four-year term.

All registered electors (British, Irish, Commonwealth and European Union citizens) living in Salford aged 18 or over will be entitled to vote in the election. People who live at two addresses in different councils, such as university students with different term-time and holiday addresses, are entitled to be registered for and vote in elections in both local authorities. Voting in-person at polling stations will take place from 07:00 to 22:00 on election day, and voters will be able to apply for postal votes or proxy votes in advance of the election.

Candidates 

Asterisks denote incumbent councillors seeking re-election.

Barton & Winton

Blackfriars & Trinity

Boothstown & Ellenbrook

Broughton

Cadishead & Lower Irlam

Claremont

Eccles

Higher Irlam & Peel Green

Kersal & Broughton Park

Little Hulton

Ordsall

Pendlebury & Clifton

Pendleton & Charlestown

Quays

Swinton & Wardley

Swinton Park

Walkden North

Walkden South

Weaste & Seedley

Worsley & Westwood Park

References

Salford City Council elections
Salford